Roman Zarubin (born December 4, 1976 in Belaya Kalitva, Rostov) is a Russian sprint canoer who has competed since the late 1990s. He won seven medals at the ICF Canoe Sprint World Championships with a gold (K-4 500 m: 2001), three silvers (K-2 200 m: 1999, K-4 200 m: 2001, K-4 500 m: 2001), and three bronzes (K-4 200 m: 2009, K-4 500 m: 1998, K-4 1000 m: 2001).

Zarubin also competed in two events at the 2000 Summer Olympics in Sydney, finishing seventh in the K-4 1000 m event while being eliminated in the semifinals of the K-2 500 m event.

References
Canoe09.ca profile 

Sports-reference.com profile

1976 births
Canoeists at the 2000 Summer Olympics
Living people
Olympic canoeists of Russia
Russian male canoeists
People from Belaya Kalitva
ICF Canoe Sprint World Championships medalists in kayak
Sportspeople from Rostov Oblast